Al-Seeb Club (also known locally as The Emperor, or "Master of the Clubs", or simply as Al-Seeb or Seeb Club) is an Omani professional football club based in Al-Seeb, that competes in the Oman Professional League, the top flight of Omani Football. Their home ground is Al-Seeb Stadium. The stadium is government owned, but they also own their own personal stadium and sports equipment, as well as their own training facilities. In 2022, they finished as The Treble with winning the Omani League, Sultan Qaboos Cup and AFC Cup in the same year.

History
Al-Seeb Club was founded on 3 January 1972 after merging four different small teams (Watan, Butolah, Hilal and Fida) in Al-Seeb area. The four teams agreed after several meetings in between to unite together and form Al-Seeb. The club was officially registered on 26 June 2002.

Shihab Bin Tariq is the leader and chairman of Al-Seeb since 1982. He joined the club in 1975 after completing his university studies and then started with the club playing for the volleyball first team. He also participated in other games such as football, basketball and table tennis. His father was also a sportsperson as he was a hockey player and a swimmer.

Being a multisport club
Although being mainly known for their football, Al-Seeb Club like many other clubs in Oman, have not only football in their list, but also hockey, volleyball, handball, basketball, badminton and squash. They also have a youth football team competing in the Omani Youth league.

Crest and colours
Al-Seeb Club have been known since establishment to wear a full yellow or green (Away) kit (usually a darker shade of yellow or green). They have also had many different sponsors over the years. As of now, Adidas provides them with kits.

Honours and achievements

National titles
Omani League: (2) 
Winners: 2019–20, 2021–22
Runners-up: 1994–95.

Sultan Qaboos Cup: (4)
Winners: 1996, 1997, 1998, 2022.
Runners-up: 2003, 2005.

Oman Professional League Cup: (1)
Winners: 2007.
Runners-up: 2013.

Oman Super Cup: (2)
Winners: 2020, 2022.
Runners-up: 1999, 2004.

AFC Cup: (1)
Winners: 2022

Sultan Qaboos Cup (U-19): (6)
Winners: 1998, 2003, 2005, 2006, 2007, 2008.
Runners-up: 2003, 2005.

Oman Youth League (U-16): (0)
Runners-up: 1989–90, 2003–04.

Oman Youth League (U-16) – Muscat: (2) 
Winners: 1991–92, 2003–04.
Runners-up: 1989–90, 1992–93.

Honours and achievements (Other Sports) 
Hockey
Sultan Qaboos Cup (7): 
Winners 1989, 1991, 1992, 1993, 1994, 1996, 1997 
Runners-up 1995
Oman Hockey Premier League (3): 
Winners 1993, 1994, 1995
Runners-up 1996
National Youth Championship (U-16) (2): 
Winners 1990–91, 1991–92
Runners-up 1992–93

Table Tennis
National Championship (1): 
Winners 1994–95

Basketball
National Championship (4): 
Winners 1987–88, 2000–2001, 2003–04, 2007–08
Runners-up 1986–87, 1988–89, 1989–90, 1992–93, 1993–94, 1994–95, 1995–1996, 1998–99, 2002–03, 2004–05, 2005–06
National Youth Championship (U-16) (1): 
Winners 1995–96
Runners-up 1994–95
National Youth Championship (U-16) (0): 
Runners-up 1990–91, 1995–96

Handball
National Championship (2): 
Winners 2006–2007, 2007–08
Runners-up 1988–89, 1999–00, 2001–02, 2002–03, 2003–04, 2005–06
National Youth Championship (U-16) (0): 
Runners-up 1988–89, 1990–91

Volleyball
National Championship (7): 
Winners 1988–89, 1989–1990, 1990–91, 1993–94, 1995–96, 1996–97, 2007–08
Runners-up 1987–88, 1991–92, 2007–08

Club performance-International Competitions

AFC competitions
AFC Cup: 1 appearance
2022 : Champions
Asian Club Championship: 2 appearances
1995 : First Round
Asian Cup Winners' Cup: 1 appearance
1997–98 : First Round
1998–99 : First Round

UAFA competitions
GCC Champions League: 1 appearance
2015 : Runners-up

Players

First team squad

Personnel

Technical staff

References

External links

Al-Seeb Club at Soccerway
Al-Seeb Club at Goalzz

1972 establishments in Oman
Association football clubs established in 1972
Football clubs in Oman
Oman Professional League
Seeb